London Assurance (originally titled Out of Town) is a five-act comedy by Dion Boucicault. It was the second play that he wrote but his first to be produced. Its first production was by Charles Matthews and Madame Vestris's company and ran from 4 March 1841 at the Theatre Royal, Covent Garden. It was Boucicault's first major success.

Characters

Sir Harcourt Courtly, cultured 57-year-old fop
Charles Courtly, his dissolute son
Dazzle, Charles's equally dissolute companion
Max Harkaway, country squire
Grace Harkaway, Max's 18-year-old niece, betrothed to Sir Harcourt
Lady Gay Spanker, horse-riding virago
Mr. Adolphus "Dolly" Spanker, her ineffectual husband
Mark Meddle, lawyer
Pert, Grace's maid
Cool, Charles's valet
James (Simpson)
Martin, servant to the Courtlys
Solomon Isaacs, moneylender, in pursuit of Charles

Plot

Act 1
Charles and Dazzle arrive at Sir Harcourt's London home after a night on the town and manage to avoid Harcourt with Cool's help; Harcourt still believes that Charles is a clean-living innocent. Max arrives to make the final arrangements for Harcourt's marriage to Max's niece Grace. Max has made Grace's inheritance contingent on her marrying Harcourt; if she does not, it will pass to Charles. In return, Harcourt has financially helped him. Harcourt leaves and Dazzle bumps into Max, gaining himself an invitation to Oak Hall in Gloucestershire, Max's country house, and Charles will accompany him on the trip.

Act 2
At Oak Hall, Grace tells her maid Pert about her acceptance of marriage to the aged Sir Harcourt and explains her view of love as an "epidemic madness". Charles and Dazzle arrive; Charles does not know of his father's marriage plans and immediately starts courting Grace. Harcourt arrives and Charles tells him that he is actually named Augustus Hamilton and merely bears a remarkable likeness to Charles. His father is convinced for a time.

Act 3
Lady Gay Spanker and her husband "Dolly" arrive, and Sir Harcourt immediately falls in love with the former. Grace begins to fall in love with Charles/Augustus in spite of herself. When Lady Gay interrupts their courtship, Charles easily persuades the lady to distract Sir Harcourt from marriage to Grace by apparently accepting his affections. Charles leaves as 'Augustus', returning as Charles to tell Grace that 'Augustus' has been killed, to see if she really loves him, whilst Lady Gay and Sir Harcourt plan to elope.

Act 4
The elopement is frustrated by Max, Dolly and the local lawyer Meddle. Dolly challenges Sir Harcourt to a duel. Sir Harcourt realises he has been duped and resolves to release Grace from their marriage contract.

Act 5
Max prevents the duel and Grace insists on going through with the marriage to Sir Harcourt, as a ruse to force Charles's hand. Charles's creditors catch up with him. Dolly forgives Gay and Sir Harcourt finds out his son's true nature as well as acceding to Charles's marriage to Grace.

Style
The play is considered an intermediate point between the 18th-century comedies of Richard Brinsley Sheridan and Oliver Goldsmith on the one hand and Oscar Wilde’s The Importance of Being Earnest on the other.

Production history
The play's first production ran for three months, with Madame Vestris as Grace Harkaway and Charles Mathews as Dazzle, and was soon followed (from 11 October 1841, at the Park Theatre) by its first New York production, with Charlotte Cushman as Lady Gay Spanker.

According to casting notes from Methuen & Co Ltd's 1971 publication of the play, the Royal Shakespeare Company produced the show with director Ronald Eyre. The first performance was on June 23, 1970, and featured Donald Sinden as Sir Harcourt Courtly, Michael Williams as Charles, Judi Dench as Grace and Barrie Ingham as Dazzle which transferred to the Albery Theatre in London and had a run at the Palace Theatre on Broadway in New York. Eyre was nominated for a Tony Award for his directing and Sinden was the first recipient of the Broadway Drama Desk Special Award. A 1974 production saw Roger Rees take on the role of Charles, and Dinsdale Landen play Dazzle. 

In 1976, the play was adapted for television by the BBC for their Play of the Month series, with Anthony Andrews as Charles Courtly and Landen reprising his role of Dazzle. It also featured Judy Cornwell as Lady Gay, James Bree as her husband Adolphus, Charles Gray as Sir Harcourt, Jan Francis as Grace, Clifford Rose as Cool and Nigel Stock as Max.

A 1989 stage production at the Chichester Festival Theatre (directed by Sam Mendes and featuring Paul Eddington as Sir Harcourt) later transferred to London. Its cast also included John Warner as Adolphus. Other productions include one at the Royal Exchange Theatre, Manchester in 2004, and a 2008 production at the Watermill Theatre in Bagnor, which toured to Guildford.

In 1991, the play was adapted for radio and directed by Sue Wilson on BBC Radio 4, with Daniel Massey as Sir Harcourt, Elizabeth Spriggs as Lady Gay, Samantha Bond as Grace, Reece Dinsdale as Charles Courtly and Sir Michael Hordern as Sir Charles Crawford.

The Royal National Theatre revived the play in March 2010, directed by Nicholas Hytner and featuring Simon Russell Beale as Sir Harcourt and Fiona Shaw as Lady Gay. A live performance was simulcast to cinemas around the world through their NTLive! program.

Notes

Sources
Templeman Library, University of Kent
Stratford Festival

External links
 
 

English plays
1841 plays
Comedy plays
Plays by Dion Boucicault